Henri Kivioja (born June 20, 1986) is Finnish professional ice hockey right winger. He is currently a free agent having last played for IPK of Mestis.

Kivioja played three games for SaiPa during the 2007–08 SM-liiga season.

References

External links

1986 births
Living people
Finnish ice hockey right wingers
Iisalmen Peli-Karhut players
Jokipojat players
Kiekko-Vantaa players
KooKoo players
People from Iisalmi
Rovaniemen Kiekko players
SaiPa players
Sportspeople from North Savo